Mushuddi Union is a union parishad of Dhanbari Upazila, Tangail District, Bangladesh. It is situated 65 km north of Tangail.

Demographics

According to Population Census 2011 performed by Bangladesh Bureau of Statistics, The total population of Mushuddi union is 15,796. There are 4195 households in total.

Education

The literacy rate of Mushuddi Union is 37.9% (Male-39.3%, Female-36.7%).

See also
 Union Councils of Tangail District

References

Populated places in Dhaka Division
Populated places in Tangail District
Unions of Dhanbari Upazila